The Nordic Light Open (sponsored by Nordea) was a women's tennis tournament held in Stockholm, Sweden (in 2002 and 2003 the tournament was played in Espoo, Finland on clay courts). Held from 2002 to 2008, this WTA Tour event was a Tier IV-tournament and was played on outdoor hardcourts.

As from 2009, the Nordic Light Open was replaced by the women's Swedish Open, at Båstad.

Past finals

Singles

Doubles

See also
List of tennis tournaments
List of sporting events in Sweden

External links
Official website

 
Tennis tournaments in Sweden
Hard court tennis tournaments
WTA Tour
International sports competitions in Stockholm
Tennis tournaments in Finland
Defunct tennis tournaments in Europe
Defunct sports competitions in Sweden